David Haughton (born August 1, 1991) is an American professional basketball player for Pelister of the Macedonian First League. He played college basketball for Sullivan County Community College and Purchase State. Haughton entered the 2014 NBA draft, but was not selected in the draft's two rounds.

High school career
Haughton played high school basketball at Woodlands High School in Greenburgh, NY.

College career
Haughton played college basketball at Sullivan County Community College, from 2010 to 2012. He then was transferred at Purchase State, where he played from 2012 to 2014 under coach Jeff Charney. During his first year with the panthers, Haughton went to average 7.4 points, 6.7 rebounds and 0.6 blocks per game. Coming at his senior year, Haughton became the captain and was one of the key players of the team. He improved his numbers, averaging 9.3 points per game, he was the top rebounder of the team, having 10.8 per game and he also had 1.3 blocks per game.

Professional career

Rakvere Tarvas
After going undrafted in the 2014 NBA draft, Haughton signed with the Estonian club Rakvere Tarvas. After a pretty good first season with the club, he renewed his contract with the club for another year.

Aries Trikala
On October 4, 2016, he joined Aries Trikala of the Greek Basket League. He stayed at the club for one year, averaging 5.9 points and 4.8 rebounds per game.

Balkan Botevgrad
On August 3, 2017, Haughton joined Balkan Botevgrad of the Bulgarian league. He went on to average 7.4 points and 5.2 rebounds in 19.4 minutes per game.

Hallmann Vienna
On June 15, 2018, Haughton joined Vilpas Vikings of the Korisliiga. He never appeared in a game for the team and he joined Hallmann Vienna of the Austrian Bundesliga.

References

1991 births
Living people
American expatriate basketball people in Estonia
American expatriate basketball people in Greece
Aries Trikala B.C. players
BC Balkan Botevgrad players
Basketball players from New York (state)
Basketball players from Texas
BC Rakvere Tarvas players
Centers (basketball)
College men's basketball players in the United States
Power forwards (basketball)
State University of New York at Purchase alumni
SUNY Sullivan Generals men's basketball players
American men's basketball players